Neugilching station is a railway station in the municipality of Neugilching, located in the Starnberg district in Upper Bavaria, Germany.

History
The Neugilching stop went into operation on 1 May 1972 shortly before the start of the S-Bahn operation as a replacement for the Weichselbaum stop, which was closed at the same time. The unoccupied Haltepunkt is located in the centre of the Gilching district of Neugilching and was initially equipped with a side platform. With the double-track line extension, Deutsche Bundesbahn built a second side platform by 1985.

References

External links

Munich S-Bahn stations
Railway stations in Bavaria
Buildings and structures in Starnberg (district)
Railway stations in Germany opened in 1972
1972 establishments in West Germany